Caroline Coon (born 1945) is an English artist, journalist and political activist. Her artwork often explores sexual themes from a feminist standpoint. Coon had her first solo painting exhibition at The Gallery Liverpool entitled "Caroline Coon: The Great Offender" which ran through May 2018.

Life

Coon was born to a family of Kent landowners and had five brothers. She left home at 16 and moved to London to find a job. She lived in Notting Hill and began by doing some modelling work, including making a softcore porn film. Trained as a figurative painter, she became involved in the 1960s underground movement in London while attending art school. In 1967, with Rufus Harris, she co-founded Release, an agency set up to provide legal advice and arrange legal representation for young people charged with the possession of drugs. She remains politically active, campaigning primarily for feminist causes, including the legalisation of prostitution and the legalisation of drugs.

She was educated at Legat Ballet School (1950-55), the Royal Ballet School (1955-61), Northampton College of Art (Fine Art Pre-diploma 1963-65), Central St Martins College of Art (Fine Art 1965-67) and Brunel University London (PSE 1970-72).

In the 1970s, she became involved in the London punk scene, writing about bands for Melody Maker and providing artwork for groups including The Clash, whom she briefly managed, and The Police. Her interviews and reviews were noted for interrogating the attitudes of leading punk bands toward gender and sexuality.

In the "Punky Business" episode of the BBC comedy series The Goodies, Jane Asher plays a parody of Coon ("Caroline Kook"), the dream lover of Tim Brooke-Taylor's aspiring punk rock star. Coon also inspired Robert Wyatt's lyrics for the Matching Mole song "O Caroline", The Stranglers' "London Lady" and, in her view, Bob Dylan's "She Belongs to Me", although other women have also been identified as the subject of the song.

In 1995 her painting Mr Olympia was not shown at Tate Liverpool because the male subject had a semi-erect penis. In June 2000 she won damages of £40,000 and legal costs of £33,000 from publisher Random House after author Jonathon Green made false claims regarding her in his 1998 book All Dressed Up: the Sixties and the Counterculture. Coon published an intimate memoir, Laid Bare, in 2016.

Publications

The Release Report on Drug Offenders and the Law. Sphere, 1969. .
1988: The New Wave Punk Rock Explosion. Hawthorn, 1977. .
Laid Bare – Diary – 1983–1984. Cunst Art, 2016. .

See also

 Sex-positive feminism
 Sex-positive movement

References

External links
 Caroline Coon website
 
 Release

1945 births
Living people
Bisexual painters
Bisexual feminists
Bisexual women
English women painters
English music journalists
People educated at the Royal Ballet School
Alumni of Brunel University London
Alumni of Saint Martin's School of Art
Melody Maker writers
English LGBT painters
English LGBT writers
British LGBT journalists
English women journalists
Women writers about music
21st-century British women artists
21st-century English women
21st-century English LGBT people